

Television

Radio

References

Big Ten men's basketball tournament
Big Ten Conference tournament finals
CBS Sports